The Passaic Academy for Science and Engineering is a four-year public magnet middle /  high school in Passaic in Passaic County, New Jersey, United States, operated as part of the Passaic City School District and serving students in sixth through twelfth grades offered by the school district.

As of the 2021–22 school year, the school had an enrollment of 814 students and 58.5 classroom teachers (on an FTE basis), for a student–teacher ratio of 13.9:1. There were 813 students (99.9% of enrollment) eligible for free lunch and none eligible for reduced-cost lunch.

Administration
The school's principal is Dr. Jennifer Aguilar. Her core administration team includes the assistant principal.

References

External links 
School website
Passaic Public Schools

School Data for the Passaic Public Schools, National Center for Education Statistics

Education in Passaic County, New Jersey
Middle schools in New Jersey
Public high schools in Passaic County, New Jersey
Passaic, New Jersey